Amatenango de la Frontera is a town and one of the 122 municipalities of Chiapas, in southern Mexico. It covers an area of 171.4 km² and is a part of Mexico's border with Guatemala. 

As of 2010, the municipality had a total population of 29,547, up from 26,094 as of 2005. 

The municipality had 123 localities, the largest of which (with 2010 populations in parentheses) were: El Pacayal (3,045), classified as urban, and Potrerillo (2,062), Nuevo Amatenango (1,594), Guadalupe Victoria (1,541), and Nueva Morelia (1,032), classified as rural.

References

Municipalities of Chiapas